Up the Down Staircase is a novel written by Bel Kaufman, published in 1964, which spent 64 weeks on The New York Times Best Seller list. In 1967 it was released as a film starring Sandy Dennis, Patrick Bedford, Ruth White, Jean Stapleton and Eileen Heckart.

Plot
Sylvia Barrett, an idealistic English teacher at an inner city high school, hopes to nurture her students' interest in classic literature (especially Chaucer and writing). She quickly becomes discouraged during her first year of teaching, frustrated by bureaucracy, the indifference of her students, and the incompetence of many of her colleagues. The title of the book is taken from a memo telling her why a student was being punished: he had gone "up the down staircase". She decides to leave the public school (government-funded) system to work in a smaller private setting. She changes her mind, though, when she realizes that she has, indeed, touched the lives of her students.

The novel is epistolary; aside from opening and closing chapters consisting entirely of dialogue the story is told through memos from the office, fragments of notes dropped in the trash can, essays handed in to be graded, lesson plans, suggestions dropped in the class suggestion box, and most often by inter-classroom notes that are a dialogue between Sylvia and an older teacher. Sylvia also writes letters to a friend from college who chose to get married and start a family rather than pursuing a career. The letters serve as a recap and summary of key events in the book, and offer a portrait of women's roles and responsibilities in American society in the mid-1960s.

An inter-classroom note in which the older teacher is translating the jargon of the memos from the office includes the memorable epigram Let it be a challenge to you' means you're stuck with it." Calling a trash can a circular file comes from the same memo: Keep on file in numerical order' means throw in waste-basket." Another, "It has come to my attention" means "You're in trouble."

Adaptations
The novel has been adapted to film and the stage. Tad Mosel wrote the screenplay for the 1967 film version starring Sandy Dennis as Sylvia Barrett. The play is frequently performed in high school drama classes. The film version was parodied in Mad magazine as "In the Out Exit" in regular issue #118, April 1968. Up the Down Staircase title was parodied by the South Park episode "Up the Down Steroid".

References

1964 American novels
American novels adapted into films
Epistolary novels
Novels set in high schools and secondary schools
Novels set in the United States